Murugeysen Rajendra (4 July 1911 – 10 March 1991) was a leading Ceylonese civil servant.

Early life
Rajendra was born on 4 July 1911 in British Malaya. He was the son of Visvanathan Murugeysen, who hailed from Vaddukoddai in northern Ceylon, an officer in the British colonial administration and head of the telegraph office in Kuala Lumpur. Rajendra had his early education at the Victoria Institution before being sent to Ceylon along with his brother Tiruchelvam to study at S. Thomas' College, Mount Lavinia. The brothers were placed under the guardianship S. J. V. Chelvanayakam. At St. Thomas he was a close friend of Dudley Senanayake, later Prime Minister. After school Rajendra joined the Ceylon University College, graduating in 1933 with a BA honours degree history.

Rajendra married Neela, a daughter of G. Wignarajah. They had two sons (Jayantha and Ajita) and a daughter (Malathy).

Career
Rajendra joined the Ceylon Civil Service as a cadet on 12 December 1934. He was Assistant Government Agent in Matara, Hambantota, Chilaw, Kandy and Nuwara Eliya before becoming Government Agent of Eastern Province (1 August 1949 to 6 March 1950) and Government Agent of North Central Province in 1951. He was Lands and Land Development Commissioner from 1954 to 1959. He was later permanent secretary at the Ministry of Post, Broadcasting and Information and Ministry of Nationalised Services. He was Treasury Secretary and Head of the Public Service from 1968 to 1971.

Later life
After retirement Rajendra was chairman of the Freedom from Hunger Foundation and a member of the Monetary Board (1971–77). He died on 10 March 1991.

References

1911 births
1991 deaths
Alumni of S. Thomas' College, Mount Lavinia
Alumni of the Ceylon University College
Government Agents (Sri Lanka)
Malaysian people of Sri Lankan Tamil descent
Permanent secretaries of Sri Lanka
People from British Ceylon
Sri Lankan Tamil civil servants